Hammer Down is the third album from The Steeldrivers. It was released on February 5, 2013 by Rounder Records.

Critical reception

AllMusic's review of Hammer Down says, "On their third album, The SteelDrivers continue to forge their own unique path in the world of bluegrass/acoustic music. They play music that sounds like bluegrass on the surface, but they usually eschew the high lonesome harmonies of traditional bluegrass for a more mainstream approach that often sounds like hardcore country gone acoustic." They give the album 3½ out of a possible five stars.

John Lawless reviews the album for Bluegrass Today. "Several of the songs on Hammer Down are contributions from founding members Chris Stapleton and Mike Henderson, both of whom have stepped down from active touring, but whose distinctive songwriting has helped define the group since their start in 2008. Compositions from Rogers and Nichols are also included."

The Washington Post writes, "On Hammer Down, the quintet's first album with its new lineup, the SteelDrivers stand out as one bluegrass group that embraces the genre's rough-and-tumble, working-class roots. The songs about alcohol, betrayal and violence feature vocals and solos raw enough to make it all credible."

PopMatters''' Arnold Pan writes, "PopMatters Editor Sarah Zupko couldn't have been any more to the point when she wrote last year that, "As far as I’m concerned, Nashville's SteelDrivers are the finest neo-bluegrass group on the planet right now." So it shouldn't come as any surprise that the acclaimed, Grammy-nominated Americana act has kept its winning streak going with its third album Hammer Down."

Jay Minkin of No Depression writes, "The Nashville based quintet is one of the most heralded new bluegrass bands around.  Since the release of their self-titled Lp (2008) and Reckless (2010), the SteelDrivers have been nominated for three Grammys, four International Bluegrass Music Association awards, and as an Emerging Artist of the Year from the Americana Music Association."

Donald Teplyske of Country Standard Time concludes his review by saying, "Hammer down, indeed."

Cybergrass' review states, "The SteelDrivers’ brand of bluegrass – intense, dark, poetic, and inescapably human – is a refreshing reminder of the timeless power of string band music, and is captured perfectly on the new Hammer Down."My Kind of Country's review says, "Every song on the album was co-written by either a present or former SteelDriver, and lead vocalist Gary Nichols’ gruff but soulful voice is nicely complemented by the harmonies of fiddle player Tammy Rogers and bassist Mike Fleming. Many of the songs have a Celtic flavor to them, sounding a lot like some of the recordings that The Chieftains made with a variety of Nashville artists"

Track listing

Musicians
Richard Bailey – Banjo
Mike Fleming – Bass, Vocals
Tammy Rogers – Fiddle, Viola, Cello, Vocals
Gary Nichols – Guitar, Vocals
Brent Truitt – Mandolin, Bouzouki on "I'll Be There" and Guitar on "Burnin' the Woodshed Down"

Production
Booking – KCA
Assistant Engineer – Kyle Manner
Engineer (Editing, Assistant) – Gary Nichols
Engineer (Mixing) – Luke Wooten
Engineer (Recording) – Jimmy Nutt, John Caldwell
Liner Notes – Juli Thanki
Mastered By – Paul Blakemore
Additional Mixing By – Brent Truitt, Kyle Manner
Photography By – Mickey Dobo
Producer – Luke Wooten, The SteelDrivers
Additional Recording By, Additional Editing By – Brent Truitt
Distributed By – Concord Music Group, Inc.
Manufactured By – Concord Music Group, Inc.
Recorded At – Station West
Recorded At – The Cave, Nashville, TN
Recorded At – The NuttHouse
Edited At – The Cave, Nashville, TN
Mastered At – CMG Mastering

Track information and credits verified from the album's liner notes. Some credits adapted from Discogs''.

References

External links
The SteelDrivers Official Site
Rounder Records Official Site

2013 albums
Rounder Records albums
The SteelDrivers albums